Nariman Jamshedji "Nari" Contractor  (born 7 March 1934) is a former Indian cricket player, who was a left-handed opening batsman. His professional career ended after a serious injury.

Cricket career
Contractor began his first-class career, playing for the Gujarat. The captain of Gujarat Phiroz Khambata saw how Nari played in the selection trial matches for MCA's Silver Jubilee matches in 1955. He did well in the trials and expected to be selected for the matches against Pakistan Services & Bhawalpur Cricket Association. He got to the team because Captain Kambatha had dropped out. Contractor scored hundreds in both innings of his debut, becoming the second man after Arthur Morris to do so.

Later he was chosen to play for India. Nari became an opener after one of the players Vinoo Mankad couldn't take part in a Test match against New Zealand at Delhi in 1955. Later he became an Indian captain.

At Lord's in 1959, he broke two ribs in the first innings by Brian Statham, despite which he scored 81. Later in the year, his 74 in the second innings at Kanpur was crucial in India winning its first Test against Australia. This innings ended when he pulled Alan Davidson, who was bowling left-arm spin at the time. Neil Harvey at short leg ducked and turned, but the ball got stuck between his legs.

Injury and consequences

Contractor led India to a series win against England in 1961–62 and captained the side to Caribbean the same season. After two Tests, Indian team traveled to Barbados. There, in a tour match against Barbados at the Kensington Oval in Bridgetown, in March 1962, he was on 2 not out while opening the batting with Dilip Sardesai during his side's first innings, when his attention was for a moment distracted as he faced Charlie Griffith in the fourth ball of the second over. He saw somebody open a window in the pavilion, and consequently was unable to concentrate on the ball following its delivery by Griffith, seeing the ball "just inches away before it hit" him. Contractor took a blow at the back of his skull fracturing it. A blood clot had developed inside his skull and pressing against the brain paralyzing him from the waist down. Two surgeries were performed to remove the clot. Requiring blood transfusion for the purpose, the West Indies captain Frank Worrell donated blood, alongside Contractor's teammates Chandu Borde, Bapu Nadkarni and Polly Umrigar. Contractor's life was saved but his international career was abruptly ended as a result. Mansoor Ali Khan of Pataudi took over the captaincy from the third test. In a recent interview, Contractor mentioned as his only regret that he wanted play just one Test after the injury, but people did not want him to.

At the time Contractor was seriously injured, cricket batsmen did not wear helmets. They do now.

During his playing days, Contractor was considered a glamour boy of Indian cricket. In an interview with Simi Garewal in 1999, former Tamil Nadu chief minister Jayalalithaa stated that as a schoolgirl she had a crush on Contractor.

Present time

Contractor now lives in Mumbai where he coaches at the Cricket Club of India Academy. He received the C.K. Nayudu Lifetime Achievement Award in 2007.

References

External links
 
 "I would love to play the IPL": Nari Contractor Interview in 2012
 "Simi Gatewal Rendezvous with Jayalalithaa"

1934 births
Living people
Gujarat cricketers
India Test cricket captains
India Test cricketers
Indian cricketers
Railways cricketers
Indian Universities cricketers
West Zone cricketers
North Zone cricketers
Parsi people
Recipients of the Padma Shri in sports
Indian cricket coaches
Indian cricket administrators
Cricketers from Gujarat
People from Panchmahal district